Lodwick is a surname. Notable people with the surname include:

 Francis Lodwick (1619–1694), Dutch pioneer of a priori languages who lived in London
 Jake Lodwick (born 1981), American software engineer, serial entrepreneur and investor
 John Lodwick (1916–1959), British novelist
 Jonathon Lodwick (born 1989), English barrister and first-class cricketer
 Kathleen L. Lodwick (1944–2022), American educator, historian, biographer and author
 Lisa Lodwick (1988–2022), British archaeologist
 Seeley Lodwick (1920–2006), American politician
 Todd Lodwick (born 1976), American skier

See also
 Lodwick Field, airport
 Ludwick, surname